Nainpur is a town and Municipal Council in the Mandla district, of the Indian state of Madhya Pradesh.

Geography 
Nainpur is a municipality (e.g., town) north of the Nainpur Forest Range. The town borders Bamhni forest range. 11A highway crosses this town. Nainpur is bordered by the Chakor river and the Thanwar river. South of Nainpur is a lake and Taalab Railway.

Demographics 
 India census, Nainpur had a population of approximately 25,000. Males constitute 51% of the population and females 49%. Nainpur has an average literacy rate of 75%, higher than the national average of 59.5%; male literacy is 81% and female literacy is 68%. In Nainpur, 12% of the population is under 6 years of age.

Government 
Nainpur is a Tehsil. It is administered by Nainpur Nagar Palika. The town is divided into 15 wards. Each ward is represented by a ward member known as a Parshad. These 15 members form a council (Parishad) that elects the Nagar Paalika Adhyaksha (head of the municipal council). Two nominated Parshads  govern in the Parishad.

Climate 
The city has the typical hot and dry climate of the Great Indian Plateau. Nainpur is hot during summers with temperatures reaching 44 Celsius, while the winters offer temperatures around 15 Celsius. The July to September months bring heavy rains with the onset of the Southwestern monsoon.

Economy 

Nearby banks include State Bank Of India, Central Bank Of India, Narmada Jhabua Gramin Bank, Sahkari Bank Maryadit, and Branch of Fino Payments Bank.

It has an irrigation canal system to boost agriculture based economy.Business activities of town by forest produce from Neighbouring Satpura hills provide wild fruits locally called Jamun, Achar (chirongy), Barry, Sarifa, Anwla, chirongi, Bail & herbal fruits like Harra,Bahera,Gondh, Mahua. City has a big railway junction having large employee stimulate demand.

Transport 

Nainpur is connected by broad gauge rail to the rest of India. It is on the route to Seoni-Mandla Highway.
The nearest airport is Jabalpur.

Rail 

Nainpur Junction was a railway hub on the Narrow Gauge line. It was the junction point of Jabalpur 110 km to its north, Balaghat 76 km to its south, Mandla 50 km to its east and Chhindwara 150 km to its west. It is connected to Nagpur via Chhindwara and Gondia. It was Asia's largest Narrow Gauge Railway Junction before the recent Gauge Conversion Project. Presently, Nainpur to Gondia and Nainpur To Mandla gauge conversion is complete. Nainpur to Seoni gauge conversion is under way.People who comes from rail route from Jabalpur, Nagpur for Kanha National Park, break train journey here to go by road or by interchanging train to reach Chiraidongry station & then fallow road route to Kanha. A narrow gauge Rail Museum has been established in Nainpur to retain the glorious Narrow gauge era.

Road 

Nainpur is connected to Jabalpur, Seoni, Chhindwara, Balaghat and Mandla by road. It is connected by Mandla to Raipur, Balaghat to Gondia and Seoni to Nagpur by road.

Notables 

 The late Anadi Ji specialized in wood craft. He built an Ashram near the city water supply lake,
A rail museum operates there.

Sport 
The city regularly witnesses  tournaments with neighbouring towns.It has a railway playground that is regularly used for cricket, hockey, and football matches."Garha Gend" is one of local game which is played with sticks & rubber or cotton made balls. This game can be played with many players. In this game each player having stick, establishes a station (Garha),Every stick or one of leg of player is on his/her station.Stations may be pieces of rock/stone placed on different locations on ground by each player except chalanger,who try to hit any player with ball in order to make one of stick holder (player) out otherwise he try to take over the unguarded station when the station holder busy in hitting the ball far distance.Players in this game make themself safe from hitting by ball, thrown by challenger & they hit the ball away,thrown by challenger to hit them."Garanchi" is another local games require minimum two players,This game are played on moderately soft ground in rainy season in which sharp pointed rod is punched into ground after every steps till punching of rod fails to hold on ground & fall over the ground.The competitor who lost the toss in the beginning has to cover entire distance by one leg jump,from starting point of game to the last point where the sharp rod could not be penetrated into ground.

Amenities 
It has bakery known for sweet dishes. Kalyan hotel sweet dish Rasmalai is notable. Picnic spots include Maaldhar, Siddhaghat, Ghoghra, Bhima Nala (fountain),Shikara & Thanwar Dam. It has lodging facilities to proceed Kanha National park via village Chiraidongry village.

Festivals 
Besides regular festivals of Hindu, Muslims, Christians,Sikh,Jain,local tribe population along with other communities enjoy
Daldali's Mela (yearly five-day festival) which takes place near Nainpur. It is celebrated during the second and third weeks of December.

Education 
Nainpur City has 5 Higher Secondary schools, 10 Primary Level, 1 PG College, 2 Para-medical, and 6 computer institutions.Many local students successfully clear the engineering entrance exams to get admission in state engineering colleges.

References 

Cities and towns in Mandla district
Mandla